Hoog Spel (High Game) was the first video games magazine in the Netherlands. The magazine was published by Rangeela B.V. between 1990 and 2000. The publisher of the magazine was Harry d’Emme.

References

External links
Official website
Rangeela B.V website

1990 establishments in the Netherlands
2000 disestablishments in the Netherlands
Computer game magazines published in the Netherlands
Defunct computer magazines
Defunct magazines published in the Netherlands
Dutch-language magazines
Magazines established in 1990
Magazines disestablished in 2000
Magazines published in Amsterdam
Monthly magazines published in the Netherlands